This article is a list of pharmacies (also known as chemists and drugstores) by country.

Australia

Pharmacies in Australia are mostly independently owned by pharmacists, often operated as franchises of retail brands offered by the three major pharmaceutical wholesalers in Australia: Australian Pharmaceutical Industries (API) and Sigma Pharmaceuticals. A minority of pharmacies are owned by friendly societies, particularly in Victoria and South Australia.
 Chemist Warehouse

API brands

 Priceline Pharmacies
 Soul Pattinsonformerly owned by Washington H Soul Pattinson

Symbion brands

 Terry White Chemmart

Canada

 Brunet
 Costco
 DRUGStore Pharmacy
 Familiprix
 Jean Coutu
 Lawtons
 London Drugs
 PharmaChoice
 Pharmasave
 Proxim (merger of Essaim and Santé Services)
 Rexall
 Shoppers Drug Mart (Pharmaprix in Quebec)
 Uniprix
 Value Drug Mart
 Walmart

Online pharmacies
 Canadian International Pharmacy Association

Defunct chains

 Cadieux (acquired by Jean Coutu in 1987)
 Cumberland Drugs (acquired by Uniprix 53 and Jean Coutu 19 in 1997)

China

The key players in the drugstore industry in China are:
 China Nepstar – Shenzhen-based; China's largest
 Super-Pharm – Israeli company; had about 65 stores in China as of 2007
 Watsons  – owned by HK-based Hutchison Whampoa

Denmark

In Denmark, all pharmacies are owned by the Association of Danish Pharmacies and controlled by the state. There are two pharmaceutically trained groups with a higher education in the Danish pharmacies: pharmaconomists and pharmacists. There are also pharmacy technicians who have a vocational training and unskilled laborers/workers who perform manual labour.

Germany

In Germany, pharmacies are known as Apotheken. As in France, they are all independently owned by pharmacists, and as in France, there are no pharmacy chains.

Online pharmacy
 Celesio
 dm-drogerie markt

Hong Kong

 Mannings
 Watsons

India

 MedPlus
 Apollo Pharmacy

Online Pharmacies
 Pharmeasy
 TATA 1MG
 Netmeds

Ireland

 Lloyds Pharmacy

Israel

 Super-Pharm

Macau

 Watsons

Malaysia

 Guardian Pharmacy
 Watsons

Mexico

 Farmacias Benavides
 Farmacias Guadalajara

Netherlands

Pharmacies in the Netherlands are mostly independently owned by pharmacists. In 2011, 31% of all pharmacies were part of one of the following chains:
 Alliance Healthcare
 Dio Drogist
 Mediq

New Zealand

 Unichem

Norway

 Alliance Boots (opened in 2008 under the name Boots Apotek, using the same logos and products as in the UK)
 Apotek 1
 Central Norway Pharmaceutical Trust
 Ditt Apotek
 Northern Norway Pharmaceutical Trust
 Southern and Eastern Norway Pharmaceutical Trust
 Vitusapotek
 Western Norway Pharmaceutical Trust

Philippines

 Mercury Drug
 South Star Drug
 Watsons

Poland

 Super-Pharm

Puerto Rico

 CVS
 Walgreens

Defunct chains

 Farmacias El Amal

Singapore

 Guardian Pharmacy
 Watsons Pharmacy

Sweden

 Apoteket
 Doc Morris

Switzerland

 Pharmacy of the Eastern Vaud Hospitals

Taiwan

 COSMED
 Tomod's
 Wellcare
 Watsons
 Don Don Donki

Thailand

 Alliance Boots
 GNC
 Watsons

United Arab Emirates

 Aster DM Healthcare

United Kingdom

 Asda Pharmacy
 Boots Pharmacy
 Lloyds Pharmacy
 Morrisons Pharmacy
 Superdrug Pharmacy
 Tesco Pharmacy
 Well Pharmacy

Other pharmacies

 Numarkbuying group of over 2,000 independently owned pharmacies in the UK

Internet pharmacies

 Pharmacy2U – online mail-order pharmacy located in the UK
 Medexpress – online mail-order pharmacy located in the UK

United States

Many pharmacy chains in the United States are owned and operated by regional supermarket brands, or national big-box store brands such as Walmart. These pharmacies are located within their larger chain stores. The three largest free-standing pharmacy chains in the United States are Walgreens, CVS, and Rite Aid.

Stand-alone pharmacy chains

 Bartell Drugs (subsidiary of RiteAid since 2020; operates as separate brand name)
 Boone Drug
 CVS Pharmacy
 Discount Drug Mart
 Duane Reade (subsidiary of Walgreens since 2010; operates as separate brand name)
 Family Pharmacy
 Good Neighbor Pharmacy
 Hartig Drug
 Health Mart
 Kinney Drugs
 Leader Drug Stores
 Lewis Drug
 Longs Drugs (subsidiary of CVS since 2008)
 Medicine Shoppe Pharmacy
 Navarro Discount Pharmacies (subsidiary of CVS since 2015)
 Rite Aid
 Thrifty White
 Valu-Rite
 Walgreens

Defunct chains

 Arbor Drugs (acquired by CVS in 1998)
 Big B Drugs (acquired by Revco in 1996; rebranded as CVS in 1997)
 Brooks Pharmacy (acquired by Rite Aid in 2007)
 Cunningham Drug (acquired by Walgreens in 1991)
 Dart Drug (bankrupt in 1990)
 Drug Emporium
 Drug Fair (company liquidated in 2009, assets purchased by Walgreens)
 Eckerd (acquired by Rite Aid in 2007)
 Fay's Drug (purchased by JC Penney and rebranded as Eckerd in 1997)
 Farmacias El Amal
 Fred's (company liquidated in 2019)
 GO Guy (purchased by Pay'n'Save in 1987)
 Genovese Drug Stores (acquired by Eckerd parent JC Penney in 1998; rebranded in 2003)
 Gray Drug (Bought by Rite Aid in 1987)
 Happy Harry's (bought by Walgreens in 2006; rebranded in 2011)
 Hook's Drug Stores (acquired by Revco in 1994)
 IDL Drug Stores
 Jean Coutu (US stores acquired by Rite Aid in 2004)
 K&B (Acquired by Rite Aid in 1997)
 Kerr Drug (acquired by Walgreens in 2013)
 Lane Drug (purchased by Rite Aid in 1989)
 LaVerdiere's (purchased by Rite Aid in 1994)
 Medi Mart (sold to Walgreens in 1980s)
 Osco Drug (freestanding stores acquired by and converted to CVS in 2006)
 Pay 'n Save (acquired by Thirfty Corp. in 1988, rebranded as PayLess Drug)
 PayLess Drug Stores (purchased by Rite Aid in 1996)
 Peoples Drug (acquired by CVS in 1990; rebranded in 1994)
 Perry Drug Stores (acquired by Rite Aid in 1995)
 Phar-Mor (bankrupt in 2002)
 Revco (bought by CVS in 1997, rebranded in 1998)
 Rexall
 Sav-on (freestanding stores acquired by and converted to CVS in 2006)
 Snyder Drug (acquired by Walgreens in 2003)
 Standard Drug (purchased by CVS in 1993; rebranded in 1994)
 Thrift Drug (purchased by JC Penney and rebranded as Eckerd in 1997)
 Thrifty Drugs (purchased by Rite Aid in 1996)
 Treasury Drug (rebranded as Eckerd in 1997)
 USA Drug (bought by Walgreens in 2012)
 Wellby Super Drug (bought by Rite Aid in 1992)

Vatican City

 Vatican Pharmacy

See also
 History of pharmacy
 List of pharmaceutical companies

References

Lists of retailers
 
Lists by country
Lists of medical and health organizations